Elizabeth Ann Wedgeworth (January 21, 1934 – November 16, 2017) was an American character actress, known for her roles as Lana Shields in Three's Company, Hilda Hensley in Sweet Dreams, and Merleen Elldridge in Evening Shade. She won the Tony Award for Best Performance by a Featured Actress in a Play for Chapter Two (1978).

Early life
Elizabeth Ann Wedgeworth was born in Abilene, Texas. She graduated from Highland Park High School in University Park, Texas, where she was a childhood friend and high school classmate of Jayne Mansfield. She dropped her first name after graduating from the University of Texas in 1957, and moved to New York City. After auditioning several times, she was admitted to The Actors Studio.

Career

Theatre
Wedgeworth made her Broadway debut in the play Make a Million in 1958. She later had many roles on Broadway and off-Broadway productions, including Period of Adjustment, Blues for Mister Charlie, The Last Analysis, and Thieves. In 1978, she won the Tony Award for Best Performance by a Featured Actress in a Play for Chapter Two.

Wedgeworth appeared off-Broadway at New York's Promenade Theatre from December 5, 1985, until June 1, 1986, in Sam Shepard's A Lie of the Mind, co-starring Harvey Keitel and Geraldine Page; coincidentally, Page, a decade Wedgeworth's senior, had married actor Rip Torn after his divorce from Wedgeworth. At the time, Page and Torn were married, but were estranged at the time of Page's death in 1987. For her performance in A Lie of the Mind, Wedgeworth was nominated for a Drama Desk Award for Outstanding Featured Actress in a Play.

Film
Wedgeworth had supporting roles in many movies. She had the female leading role opposite Gene Hackman in the 1973 film Scarecrow. She later co-starred in Bang the Drum Slowly, Law and Disorder, One Summer Love, and Thieves. In 1977, she won the National Society of Film Critics Award for Best Supporting Actress for her performance in Handle with Care.

Through the 1980s, Wedgeworth had many supporting roles, often playing mothers, such as in No Small Affair as Jon Cryer's character's, in Sweet Dreams as Patsy Cline's mother, followed by 1987's Made in Heaven as one unknowingly reunited with her dead son. In 1989, she portrayed Aunt Fern in Steel Magnolias. She appeared as Sissy Spacek's character's mother in the 1991 film Hard Promises. She also appeared in two films opposite Renée Zellweger: Love and a .45 and The Whole Wide World. Wedgeworth had her final film role in The Hawk Is Dying, with Paul Giamatti, which opened at the Sundance Film Festival in 2006.

Television
In early years, Wedgeworth had main roles on numerous daytime soap operas. She played the roles of Angela Talbot on The Edge of Night from 1966 to 1967, and later joined the cast of Another World as Lahoma Vane Lucas. She played the role from 1967 to 1970, and from 1970 to 1973 appeared on its spinoff, Somerset.

In 1979, Wedgeworth was cast as divorcée Lana Shields on the hit ABC sitcom Three's Company. Producers introduced her character to fill the void left by Audra Lindley, who had left to star in the show's spin-off, The Ropers. According to behind-the-scenes reports, the addition of Lana to the cast caused tension between series star John Ritter and the show's writers. Ritter believed it would be out of character for his character, the womanizing Jack Tripper, to inexplicably turn down the advances of Lana, a sexually voracious, attractive older woman. The writers reasoned that because Lana was older than Jack, he would be turned off. Ritter did not believe that the middle-aged Lana, only meant to be in her 40s (whereas Jack was in his late 20s/early 30s), would repel Jack. Wedgeworth claimed that she asked to be released from her contract because of Lana's dwindling role in the show.

Wedgeworth appeared in just nine episodes of the series before her character was casually written-out without any explanation and never referred to again.

In 1982, Wedgeworth worked with Linda Bloodworth-Thomason in her first comedy series, Filthy Rich, playing ditsy, good-natured Bootsie Westchester. The series was canceled after two seasons in 1983. In 1989, she guest-starred as Audrey Conner, the emotionally fragile mother of Dan Conner (played by John Goodman) on the ABC sitcom, Roseanne. Her longest role was on the CBS sitcom Evening Shade as Merleen Eldridge. The series aired from 1990 to 1994. In 1994, Wedgeworth starred in the unsuccessful Evening Shade spin-off, Harlan & Merleen.

Personal life
Wedgeworth married Rip Torn in 1955. They had a daughter, actress Danae Torn. The couple divorced in 1961. In 1970, she married acting teacher and director Ernie Martin, and, in 1972, had a daughter, actress/acting teacher/writer Diánna Martin.

Death
Wedgeworth died after a long illness, at a nursing home in North Bergen, New Jersey, aged 83.

Filmography

Film

Television

References

External links
 
 
 

1934 births
2017 deaths
20th-century American actresses
21st-century American actresses
Actresses from Texas
American stage actresses
American soap opera actresses
American television actresses
American film actresses
People from Abilene, Texas
University of Texas at Austin alumni